Jan Korger (3 November 1937 – 13 May 2016) was a Czech physician and politician for the Civic Democratic Party. He served in the House of Peoples of the Federal Assembly of Czechoslovakia in 1992, the last year of its existence. He went on to serve in the municipal government of Šumperk.

References

1937 births
2016 deaths
Civic Democratic Party (Czech Republic) politicians
People from Šumperk
Freedom Union – Democratic Union politicians